The Yatesville Covered Bridge, in Lawrence County, Kentucky near Fallsburg, was built in 1907 and was listed on the National Register of Historic Places in 1976.

It had board-and-batten siding open at the top under the eaves of the structure, and a corrugated tin roof.

While there were other beliefs about its function, the cable car system was in fact for U.S. Geological Survey measurement of flow rates of the creek.

The bridge no longer exists.

It was the last-surviving of three known covered bridges in Lawrence County, and was saved from demolition in 1965 by a letter-writing campaign.  It was bypassed, repaired, and painted red.  However, in May 1986 the bridge collapsed and its remains were removed by the county.

References

National Register of Historic Places in Lawrence County, Kentucky
Bridges completed in 1907
Covered bridges in Kentucky
Transportation in Lawrence County, Kentucky
Former buildings and structures in Kentucky
Former bridges in the United States
Wooden bridges in Kentucky
Road bridges on the National Register of Historic Places in Kentucky
1907 establishments in Kentucky
Howe truss bridges in the United States